The 2018–19 All-Ireland Intermediate Club Hurling Championship was the 15th staging of the All-Ireland Intermediate Club Hurling Championship, the Gaelic Athletic Association's intermediate inter-county club hurling tournament. The championship began on 14 October 2018 and ended on 10 February 2019.

On 10 February 2019, Oranmore-Maree won the championship following a 2-18 to 1-15 defeat of Charleville in the All-Ireland final. This was their first All-Ireland title in the grade.

Graigue-Ballycallan's Conor Murphy was the championship's top scorer with 0-40.

Format change

Prior to the 2018-19 All-Ireland Championship, the London champions received a bye to the All-Ireland quarter-final stage where they played one of the provincial champions on a year-to-year rotational basis. As of 2018, the London champions were allowed to join the Connacht Championship.

Provincial championships

Connacht Intermediate Club Hurling Championship

Quarter-final

Semi-final

Final

Leinster Intermediate Club Hurling Championship

Quarter-finals

Semi-finals

Final

Munster Intermediate Club Hurling Championship

Quarter-finals

Semi-finals

Final

Ulster Intermediate Club Hurling Championship

Quarter-finals

Semi-finals

Final

All-Ireland Intermediate Club Hurling Championship

Semi-finals

Final

Championship statistics

Top scorers

Top scorers overall

References

External links
 2018 Connacht club IHC
 AIB Leinster Club Intermediate Hurling Championship 2018
 Munster Club Championships 2018

All-Ireland Intermediate Club Hurling Championship
All-Ireland Intermediate Club Hurling Championship
2018